Abdul Wahhab Miya (born 11 November 1951) is a Bangladeshi jurist. He was appointed as acting Chief Justice of Bangladesh when former Chief Justice Surendra Kumar Sinha left.

Career
Miya was listed as a High Court Division judge in 1976. Justice Miah was appointed an additional judge to the High Court Division on 24 October 1999 and became permanent Judge in 2001. He was elevated to the Appellate Division on 23 February 2011. He was made acting Chief Justice of Bangladesh when former Chief Justice Surendra Kumar Sinha left. He resigned from his post on 2 February 2018 though he was set to retire on Nov 10, 2018. Currently he is working at North South University  
 as a Law Faculty and at BRAC University as an Adjunct Faculty.

References

Living people
20th-century Bangladeshi judges
Supreme Court of Bangladesh justices
Chief justices of Bangladesh
1951 births
21st-century Bangladeshi judges